Omar Ahmed Abdelkader (born December 29, 1979) is an amateur boxer from Kenya, who is also known as Omar Ahmed, Ahmed Abdelkader, or Ahmed Rajab Omari. He is best known for winning the gold medal in the men's heavyweight division (– 91 kg) at the 1995 All-Africa Games in Harare, Zimbabwe.

Ahmed represented his native country at the 1996 Summer Olympics in Atlanta, Georgia, being the youngest member (16 years, 205 days) of the Kenyan Olympic Team. There he was defeated in the second round by David Defiagbon from Canada.
Omar also won a gold medal in the Men's Heavyweight Division at the 1994 Commonwealth Games in Victoria, British Columbia.

References

External links
 
 

1979 births
Living people
Kenyan male boxers
Kenyan Muslims
Heavyweight boxers
Olympic boxers of Kenya
Boxers at the 1996 Summer Olympics
Commonwealth Games gold medallists for Kenya
Commonwealth Games medallists in boxing
Boxers at the 1994 Commonwealth Games
African Games gold medalists for Kenya
African Games medalists in boxing
Competitors at the 1995 All-Africa Games
Medallists at the 1994 Commonwealth Games